Oberea maculicollis is a species of beetle in the family Cerambycidae. It was described by Hippolyte Lucas in 1842. It is known from Spain and Algeria.

References

Beetles described in 1842
maculicollis